Harutaeographa stenoptera is a moth of the family Noctuidae. It is found in Russia (south-eastern Siberia, Amur, Ussuri, Primorje), Korea and China (Shaanxi).

References

Moths described in 1892
Orthosiini